Rareș Ciprian Soporan (born 29 June 1983) is a Romanian former professional football player. He played as a central defender but could also take up the role of a defensive midfielder. Soporan retired in 2014 and after that he moved to England where he works as a bartender.

He started football at CUG Cluj before moving to Universitatea Cluj in 1993. The first two seasons at "U"'s first team were rather uneventful but then Soporan made 28 appearances and scored 9 goals in just one season for the Divizia B team. Winter 2006 saw him transferred to Politehnica Timişoara for the sum of 200.000 Euros where he was coached by Gheorghe Hagi.

After a year and half, in which he did not rise up to the club's expectations, Soporan was loaned to Ceahlăul Piatra Neamţ.

References

External links
 
 

1983 births
Living people
Sportspeople from Cluj-Napoca
Romanian footballers
Association football defenders
Association football midfielders
Liga I players
Liga II players
FC Universitatea Cluj players
FC Politehnica Timișoara players
CSM Ceahlăul Piatra Neamț players
CSM Reșița players
CSM Unirea Alba Iulia players
FC Delta Dobrogea Tulcea players
Moldovan Super Liga players
FC Milsami Orhei players
Romanian expatriate footballers
Romanian expatriate sportspeople in Moldova
Expatriate footballers in Moldova